Alucita pygmaea is a species of moth of the family Alucitidae. It is found in the northern half of Australia, as well as Fiji.

The wingspan is about 8 mm.

The larvae feed on Canthium oleifolium.

External links
Australian Faunal Directory
Australian insects
Checklist of Moths of Fiji

Alucitidae
Moths described in 1890
Moths of Fiji
Moths of Australia
Taxa named by Edward Meyrick